The FIBA Oceania Championship for Men 1983 was the qualifying tournament of FIBA Oceania for the 1984 Summer Olympics. Australia won the series 2–0.

Teams that did not enter

Results

References
FIBA Archive

FIBA Oceania Championship
Championship
1983 in New Zealand basketball
1983 in Australian basketball
International basketball competitions hosted by New Zealand
Australia men's national basketball team games
New Zealand men's national basketball team games